Jimmy "Craw" Crawford (January 14, 1910 – January 28, 1980) was an American jazz drummer in the swing era.

Biography
Jimmy Crawford was born in Memphis, Tennessee, United States. He was the drummer of the Jimmie Lunceford big band for nearly 14 years from 1928 to 1942. According to Modern Drummer, Crawford "played with a strong, solid pulsation — a classic trademark of the Lunceford sound — and was a key factor in establishing the unique Lunceford beat." Later, in the 1950s, Crawford worked as a pit drummer on Broadway in such productions as Jamaica (1957-8) and Donnybrook (1961). He recorded with numerous notable artists such as Ella Fitzgerald, Dizzy Gillespie, Count Basie, Sy Oliver, Bing Crosby, Benny Goodman, and Frank Sinatra.

He died on January 28, 1980, in New York City.

Influences
Paul Motian mentioned Crawford as one of his favorite drummers.

Discography
With Buster Bailey
All About Memphis (Felsted, 1958)
With Count Basie
Memories Ad-Lib (Roulette, 1958) - with Joe Williams
String Along with Basie (Roulette, 1960)
With Kenny Burrell
Bluesin' Around (Columbia, 1961 [1983])
With Buck Clarke
The Buck Clarke Sound (Argo, 1963)
With Dizzy Gillespie
Dizzy and Strings (Norgran, 1954)
With Coleman Hawkins
The Hawk Talks (Decca, 1952-53 [1955])
With Eddie Heywood
Eddie Heywood (EmArcy, 1955)
With Quincy Jones
The Birth of a Band! (Mercury, 1959)
Quincy Plays for Pussycats (Mercury, 1959-65 [1965])

References

External links
 Jimmy Crawford recordings at the Discography of American Historical Recordings.

American jazz drummers
1910 births
1980 deaths
20th-century American drummers
American male drummers
20th-century American male musicians
American male jazz musicians